Wold is a surname. Notable people with the surname include:

 Bill Wold, American basketball player 
 Eddie Wold, American bridge player
 Edwin M. Wold (1900-1987), American businessman and politician
 Erling Wold (born 1958), American composer
 Herman Wold (1908–1992), Swedish statistician
 John S. Wold (1916-2017), American politician
 Susse Wold (born 1938), Danish actress
 Terje Wold (1899–1972), Norwegian politician